The following is a list of countries by gold exports. Data is for 2018, in millions of United States dollars, as reported by The Observatory of Economic Complexity. Currently twenty countries, as of 2018, are listed (their 2012 and 2016 figures are also provided).

References

atlas.media.mit.edu - Observatory of Economic complexity - Countries that export Gold (2012)
atlas.media.mit.edu - Observatory of Economic complexity - Countries that export Gold (2016)

Gold
Gold